Falaq Naaz is an Indian television actress. The sister of actors Shafaq Naaz and Sheezan Khan, she is best known for her roles in TV shows telecast on Colors TV channel, most notably the long running soap opera Sasural Simar Ka in which she played the character of Jhanvi Bhardwaj. Her other collaborations with the channel were Mahakali — Anth Hi Aarambh Hai, Roop, Vish Ya Amrit: Sitara and Ram Siya Ke Luv Kush.

Career
Naaz had received dance training from prominent Bollywood choreographer Saroj Khan in 2010, before she played a cameo in the longest-running comedy series Taarak Mehta Ka Ooltah Chashmah, thus making her acting debut. She followed it with roles in other TV serials, including Devon Ke Dev...Mahadev, in which she portrayed Lakshmi and Sita from 2011 to 2012. She was noticed when she played Jhanvi Bharadwaj in Colors TV's Sasural Simar Ka from 2013 to 2017.
Alongside Sasural Simar Ka, Naaz essayed Ruqaiya Sultan Begum in Bharat Ka Veer Putra – Maharana Pratap from 2014 to 2015. Post her stint in Sasural Simar Ka ended, she bagged the mythological drama Mahakali on the same channel. Along with her role in Mahakali, she appeared in Shankar Jaikishan 3 in 1as one of the lead in the show as a doctor,  Twinkle Kapoor. She entered Colors TV's Roop - Mard Ka Naya Swaroop as Minal, a class teacher in June 2018. Four months later, she starred in Star Bharat's new venture RadhaKrishn as Devki in a cameo.

In November 2018, Naaz signed Adaa Khan starrer Vish Ya Amrit: Sitara on Colors TV, wherein she played Chhabili. It didn't top the ratings and was wrapped up in June 2019. In her next venture, she portrayed Mandodari in the channel's mythological show Ram Siya Ke Luv Kush, until it concluded in February 2020.

Filmography

Television

See also 
List of Indian television actresses

References

External links
 Falaq Naaz on Instagram
 

Living people
Indian television actresses
1973 births